Feforvatnet is a lake in Nord-Fron Municipality in Innlandet county, Norway.

See also
List of lakes in Norway

References

Nord-Fron
Lakes of Innlandet